Martin Gisti (December 9, 1889 – January 18, 1971) was a Norwegian actor. He made his film debut in Kaksen paa Øverland in 1920.

Together with Amund Rydland, he wrote the script for the 1922 film Farende folk. He was also responsible for the rehearsal of the audio play Fridtjof Nansen – en helt fra vår egen tid (Fridtjof Nansen: A Hero of Our Own Time), which premiered on NRK radio, which was then directed by Nasjonal Samling, on December 1, 1941.

Filmography
 1920: Kaksen paa Øverland as Halvor, a servant boy
 1922: Farende folk as Mjøltraavaren
 1925: Himmeluret as Ola Ormestøl
 1926: Simen Mustrøens besynderlige opplevelser as Simen Mustrøen
 1932: Deception (never completed)
 1938: Det drønner gjennom dalen as a strikebreaker
 1938: Ungen as Engebret
 1939: Gryr i Norden as Karlsen, a stevedore
 1939: Hu Dagmar as Embret Storberget
 1941: Gullfjellet as Jørgen Krullerstugun
 1942: Trysil-Knut as Silver-Jan, a Swedish peddler
 1943: Unge viljer as Albert Jensen, a worker
 1944: Brudekronen as Mikkel
 1955: Trost i taklampa as Lundjordet
 1961: Fru Inger til Østråt as Bjørn
 1963: Freske fraspark
 1972: Motforestilling (extra)

References

External links
 
 Martin Gisti at the Swedish Film Database
 Martin Gisti at Filmfront

1889 births
1971 deaths
Norwegian male film actors
20th-century Norwegian male actors
Norwegian male silent film actors
People from Våler, Norway